Nematocampa is a genus of moths in the family Geometridae.

Species
Nematocampa amandaria (Guenée, 1858)
Nematocampa angulifera Oberthur, 1883
Nematocampa arenosa Butler, 1881
Nematocampa baggettaria Ferguson, 1993
Nematocampa brehmeata (Grossbeck, 1907)
Nematocampa completa Warren, 1904
Nematocampa confusa Warren, 1904
Nematocampa decolorata Warren, 1900
Nematocampa evanidaria Schaus, 1901
Nematocampa falsa Warren, 1906
Nematocampa interrupta Warren, 1907
Nematocampa perfusa Bastelberger, 1909
Nematocampa resistaria (Herrich-Schäffer, 1856)
Nematocampa reticulata Butler, 1881
Nematocampa straminea (Warren, 1900)
Nematocampa varicata Walker, 1860

References

 , 1998: A revision of the species of Nematocampa (Geometridae: Ennominae) occurring in the United States and Canada. Journal of the Lepidopterists' Society 47 (1): 60–77. Full article: .

External links

Ourapterygini